MacGinty is a surname of Irish origin. Notable people with the surname include:

AJ MacGinty (born 1990), Irish-born professional rugby player
Raphael MacGinty (born 1927), English former cricketer

See also
Tootsa MacGinty, a clothing company
McGinty